Thomas Mills may refer to:

 T. Wesley Mills (1847–1915),  Canadian physician and physiologist
 Thomas Mills (MP) (1794–1862), British politician
 Thomas Brooks Mills (1857–1930), American politician and businessman
 Thomas R. Mills, actor and director of silent films
 Thomas Mills (printer) (c. 1735–1820), English printer
 Tommy Mills (1883–1944), American football player, coach, and college athletics administrator
 Tommy Mills (footballer) (1911–?), Welsh footballer
 Tom Mills (1908–1978), Australian soldier, tin miner and businessman
David L. McCain, a former justice of the Florida State Supreme Court, who used the name "Thomas Mills" while a fugitive from justice

See also 
 Thomas Hutton-Mills Sr. (1865–1931), lawyer and nationalist leader in the Gold Coast